Bactromyia is a genus of flies in the family Tachinidae.

Species
Bactromyia adiscalis Mesnil, 1953
Bactromyia aurora Mesnil, 1953
Bactromyia aurulenta (Meigen, 1824)
Bactromyia delicatula Mesnil, 1953
Bactromyia longifacies Mesnil, 1953
Bactromyia mammillata Dear & Crosskey, 1982
Bactromyia pieridis Mesnil & Abdul Rassoul, 1972
Bactromyia zhumanovi Richter, 1991

References

Tachinidae genera
Exoristinae
Taxa named by Friedrich Moritz Brauer
Taxa named by Julius von Bergenstamm
Diptera of Asia
Diptera of Europe